is a Japanese cross-country skier who has competed since 1995. She earned the best individual finish of the host nation Japan at the FIS Nordic World Ski Championships 2007 in Sapporo with a fifth-place finish in the women's sprint event which was also her best individual finish at the FIS Nordic World Ski Championships. 

Natsumi's best individual finish at the Winter Olympics was 12th in the individual sprint at Salt Lake City in 2002.

Her best individual World Cup finish was third at a sprint event in Sweden in 2008.

References

External links
 
 

1978 births
Cross-country skiers at the 2002 Winter Olympics
Cross-country skiers at the 2006 Winter Olympics
Cross-country skiers at the 2010 Winter Olympics
Japanese female cross-country skiers
Living people
Olympic cross-country skiers of Japan
Asian Games medalists in cross-country skiing
Cross-country skiers at the 2003 Asian Winter Games
Cross-country skiers at the 2007 Asian Winter Games
Cross-country skiers at the 2011 Asian Winter Games
Asian Games gold medalists for Japan
Asian Games silver medalists for Japan
Asian Games bronze medalists for Japan
Medalists at the 2003 Asian Winter Games
Medalists at the 2007 Asian Winter Games
Medalists at the 2011 Asian Winter Games
21st-century Japanese women